Tongues of Scandal is a 1927 American silent drama film directed by Roy Clements and starring Mae Busch, William Desmond, and Ray Hallor.

Synopsis
A politician's career and marriage are both threatened by a scandal caused by his younger brother's past antics.

Cast
 Mae Busch as Helen Hanby
 William Desmond as Gov. John Rhodes
 Ray Hallor as Jimmy Rhodes
 Mathilde Brundage as Mrs. Rhodes
 Lloyd B. Carleton as Mr. Plunkett 
 Wilfrid North as Mr. Collett
 James Gordon as O'Rourke
 Jerome La Grasse as Colvin
 De Sacia Mooers as Peggy Shaw

References

Bibliography
 Connelly, Robert B. The Silents: Silent Feature Films, 1910-36, Volume 40, Issue 2. December Press, 1998.
 McCaffrey, Donald W. & Jacobs, Christopher P. Guide to the Silent Years of American Cinema. Greenwood Publishing, 1999. 
 Munden, Kenneth White. The American Film Institute Catalog of Motion Pictures Produced in the United States, Part 1. University of California Press, 1997.

External links
 

1927 films
1927 drama films
1920s English-language films
American silent feature films
Silent American drama films
Films directed by Roy Clements
American independent films
1920s independent films
1920s American films